The Pleasure Principle is the debut solo studio album by English new wave musician Gary Numan, released on 7 September 1979 by Beggars Banquet Records. The album came about six months after Replicas (1979), his second and final studio album with the band Tubeway Army. The Pleasure Principle peaked at No. 1 on the UK Albums Chart.

Recording
Following Replicas, Numan recruited a permanent drummer and a keyboard player and demoed an album's worth of new material in April 1979. This was before the single "Are "Friends" Electric?" from the previous album had been released. A second session that yielded four further songs followed some weeks later. The day after "Are "Friends" Electric?" reached number one on the UK Singles Chart, Numan and his band recorded four of the new songs in a session for John Peel, credited to Gary Numan and dropping the group name Tubeway Army. By the time Replicas reached number one on the albums chart The Pleasure Principle was being recorded at Marcus Music Studio, London.

Composition and release
The Pleasure Principle has been described as featuring synth-pop and new wave throughout. Numan completely abandoned electric guitar on the album. This change, coupled with frequent use of synthetic percussion, produced the most purely electronic and robotic sound of his career. In addition to the Minimoog synthesizer employed on his previous album, Numan made liberal use of the Polymoog keyboard, particularly its distinctive "Vox Humana" preset. Other production tricks included copious amounts of flanging, phasing and reverb, plus the unusual move of including solo viola and violin parts in the arrangements.

Lyrically, the album continued the science fiction-themes of the previous album. While not a theme album the way Replicas was, Numan has described the songs as "more of a collection of thoughts I'd had about the way technology was evolving and where it would take us."

Notable tracks included "Airlane", the lead-off instrumental; "Metal", sung from the perspective of an android longing to be human; "Films", later acknowledged as an important influence on the U.S. hip hop scene; "M.E.", standing for "Mechanical Engineering" and told from the perspective of the last machine on Earth, the electronic ballad "Complex", a UK No. 6 single; and "Cars", a worldwide synth-pop hit. "Cars" reached No. 9 in the U.S. and No. 1 in Canada, helping make The Pleasure Principle Numan's strongest North American showing, but lack of a strong commercial follow-up resulted in him being tagged as a one-hit wonder there.

Title and cover image
The title of the album was taken from the surrealist painting The Pleasure Principle by René Magritte. Subtitled (A portrait of Edward James), it depicts a seated figure whose arms rest on a wooden table upon which lies a small stone, and a ball of light obliterating the figure's head. The cover image of Numan's album is an adaptation of the painting with Numan seated in the same position dressed in a similar suit, but replacing the natural materials (wood and stone) with shiny and glowing artificial objects and futuristic shapes. According to Numan it was "a clear nod towards technology. Where Magritte had a rock on a desk, for example, I had a glowing purple Perspex pyramid."

Tour
Numan toured throughout the world in support of the album with a huge stage set including banks of neon lights and twin pyramids which moved across the stage via radio control. The live show was captured on record as Living Ornaments '79 (1981) and on video as The Touring Principle. The support act on the UK leg of the tour was Orchestral Manoeuvres in the Dark (OMD). An expanded version of Living Ornaments '79 was issued on CD in 2005, and the final show of The Touring Principle was captured on the CD Engineers (released exclusively through Numan's official website) in 2008.

Numan performed a 16-date mini-tour dedicated to the album across the UK and Ireland during November and December 2009, similar to Numan's previous tours for Replicas (1979) and Telekon (1980), performing the album in its entirety. Numan had been scheduled to play the 2010 Coachella Festival in Indio, California but was forced to cancel, due to the Icelandic volcano eruption that disrupted air travel. To make up for this, Numan embarked upon another 16-date mini-tour of the U.S. that August, in which he again performed The Pleasure Principle in its entirety.

Reissue
Of the bonus tracks later included on CD reissues, "Random" and "Oceans" were instrumental outtakes from The Pleasure Principle sessions, originally issued on vinyl with other previously unreleased tracks in 1985, while "Asylum" was the instrumental B-side of the "Cars" vinyl single. The live versions of "Me! I Disconnect From You" and "Bombers", which appeared as B-sides of "Complex", were recorded on tour and later made available in their original context on the expanded Living Ornaments '79 CD, along with "Remember I Was Vapour" and "On Broadway". The latter two tracks were first released as a promotional single shipped with early pressings of the album Telekon in 1980; Numan's cover version of the classic "On Broadway" was dominated by a characteristic synthesizer solo by then-former (and soon-to-be-again) Ultravox band member Billy Currie.

Critical reception

Robert Christgau of The Village Voice described The Pleasure Principle as "Metal Machine Music goes easy-listening," continuing: "This time he's singing about robots, engineers, and isolation. In such a slight artist, these things make all the difference."

In a retrospective review, AllMusic's Greg Prato opined that The Pleasure Principle was distinguished by the consistent quality of its songs and the presence of drummer Cedric Sharpley, who "adds a whole new dimension with his powerful percussion work." Prato concluded, "If you had to own just one Gary Numan album, The Pleasure Principle would be it."

Track listing
All tracks written by Gary Numan, except where noted.

Side one
 "Airlane" – 3:18
 "Metal" – 3:32
 "Complex" – 3:12
 "Films" – 4:09
 "M.E." – 5:37

Side two
"Tracks" – 2:51
 "Observer" – 2:53
 "Conversation" – 7:36
 "Cars" – 3:58
 "Engineers" – 4:01

CD bonus tracks
"Random" (demo) – 3:49
 "Oceans" (demo) – 3:03
 "Asylum" (B-side of "Cars") – 2:31
 "Me! I Disconnect from You" (Live) – 3:06
 "Bombers" (Live) – 5:46
 "Remember I Was Vapour" (Live)* – 4:46
 "On Broadway" (Live) (Jerry Leiber, Mike Stoller, Barry Mann, Cynthia Weil) – 4:48

30th Anniversary Edition
To coincide with The Pleasure Principle 30th Anniversary Tour, a special edition of the album was released on 21 September 2009.

Disc one
 "Airlane"
 "Metal"
 "Complex"
 "Films"
 "M.E."
 "Tracks"
 "Observer"
 "Conversation"
 "Cars"
 "Engineers"

Disc two
 "Airlane" (Demo Version)
 "Metal" (Demo Version)
 "Complex" (Demo Version)
 "Films" (Demo Version)
 "M.E." (Demo Version)
 "Tracks" (Outtake Mix)
 "Observer" (Demo Version)
 "Conversation" (Demo Version 2)
 "Cars" (Demo Version)
 "Engineers" (Demo Version)
 "Random" (2009 Remaster)
 "Oceans" (2009 Remaster)
 "Asylum" (2009 Remaster)
 "Photograph" (2009 Remaster)
 "Gymnopedie No. 1" (Demo Version)
 "Conversation" (Demo Version 1)
 "M.E." (Outtake Mix)

Disc three (Bonus tracks only available on the 3CD version available from the Numan website)
 "Down in the Park" (The Live EPs – 1980)
 "On Broadway" (The Live EPs – 1980)
 "Everyday I Die" (The Live EPs – 1980)
 "Remember I Was Vapour" (The Live EPs – 1980)
 "Bombers" (The Live EPs – 1980)
 "Me! I Disconnect from You" (The Live EPs – 1979)
 "Conversation" (The Live EPs – 1979)
 "Metal" (The Live EPs – 1979)
 "Down in the Park" (The Live EPs – 1979)
 "Airlane" (Living Ornaments '79)
 "Cars" (Living Ornaments '79)
 "We Are So Fragile" (Living Ornaments '79)
 "Films" (Living Ornaments '79)
 "Something's in the House" (Living Ornaments '79)
 "My Shadow in Vain" (Living Ornaments '79)
 "Conversation" (Living Ornaments '79)
 "The Dream Police" (Living Ornaments '79)
 "Metal" (Living Ornaments '79)

40th Anniversary Edition
To celebrate the 40th Anniversary of the release of The Pleasure Principle, a special edition of the album, The Pleasure Principle: The First Recordings was released on 11 October 2019. Released on 2 LP coloured vinyl and 2 CD editions.

CD 1
 "Cars" (Demo Version 2)
 "Films" (Demo Version)
 "Complex" (Demo Version)
 "Random" (Remastered 2009)
 "M.E." (Demo Version)
 "Conversation" (Demo Version 2)
 "Tracks" (Demo Version 1)
 "Cars" (Demo Version 1)
 "Metal" (Demo Version)
 "Airlane" (Demo Version)
 "Trois Gymnopédies No.1" (Demo)
 "Observer" (Demo Version)
 "Conversation" (Demo Version 1)
 "Engineers" (Demo Version)
 "Asylum" (Remastered 2009)
 "Oceans" (Remastered 2009)
 "Photograph" (Remastered 2009)

CD 2
 "Airlane" (BBC Peel Session)
 "Cars" (BBC Peel Session)
 "Films" (BBC Peel Session)
 "Conversation" (BBC Peel Session)
 "Tracks" (Outtake mix)
 "Complex" (Outtake mix)
 "M.E." (Outtake mix)
 "Engineers" (Outtake mix)
 "Airlane" (Outtake mix)
 "Cars" (Outtake mix)

Personnel
Credits are adapted from The Pleasure Principle liner notes.

 Gary Numan – vocals; synthesizers (Minimoog, Polymoog); synthetic percussion
 Paul Gardiner – bass
 Chris Payne – keyboards (Minimoog, Polymoog, piano); viola
 Cedric Sharpley – drums, percussion
 Billy Currie – fadeout violin on "Tracks" and "Conversation"
 Garry Robson – backing vocals on "Conversation"

Charts

Weekly charts

Year-end charts

Certifications

Legacy

"Metal" was covered by Nine Inch Nails on Things Falling Apart (2000), Thought Industry on Recruited to Do Good Deeds for the Devil (1998) and Afrika Bambaataa on Dark Matter Moving at the Speed of Light (2004), and used as backing for Planet Funk's "Who Said"). "Films" is acknowledged by Bambaataa as an important influence on the U.S. hip hop scene; "M.E." was used as backing for Basement Jaxx's "Where's Your Head At"

References

Bibliography

External links

The Pleasure Principle (Adobe Flash) at Radio3Net (streamed copy where licensed) 

 

1979 debut albums
Atco Records albums
Beggars Banquet Records albums
Gary Numan albums